Brendan Joseph Hansen (born August 15, 1981) is an American former competition swimmer who specialized in breaststroke events.  Hansen is a six-time Olympic medalist, and is also a former world record-holder in both the 100-meter and 200-meter breaststroke events (long course).

He won a total of twenty-five medals in major international competition, eighteen gold, four silver, and three bronze spanning the Olympics, the World, and the Pan Pacific Championships.  He was a member of the 2012 United States Olympic team, and won the bronze medal in the 100-meter breaststroke and a gold medal in the 4×100-meter medley relay at the 2012 Summer Olympics.

Early life and education

Hansen was born and grew up in Havertown, a suburb of Philadelphia, Pennsylvania. He attended Haverford Senior High School. He swam for several different clubs, including Karakung Swim Club and Suburban Seahawks Club. Whilst at Karakung Swin Club in Havertown, Brendan was able to compete & learn from Christopher Lesovitz and Timothy Galvin. 

While attending the University of Texas at Austin, Hansen swam for coach Eddie Reese's Texas Longhorns swimming and diving team in National Collegiate Athletic Association (NCAA) competition from 2001 to 2005.  During his time as a Longhorn swimmer, he never lost a breaststroke event.  He was a sixteen-time All-American and won fourteen NCAA national championships.  He graduated from the University of Texas with a bachelor's degree in kinesiology in 2005.

Swimming career

2001–2003

Hansen's main stroke is breaststroke.  He is well known for his unique style of breaststroke, which incorporates a kick that is much narrower than most other swimmers, including the biggest rival of his early international career, Kosuke Kitajima.

At the 2001 World Aquatics Championships in Fukuoka, Japan, Hansen won the 200-meter breaststroke with a time of 2:10.69, a championship record.

At the 2003 World Aquatics Championships in Barcelona, Spain, Hansen won gold in the 4×100-meter medley relay, silver in the 100-meter breaststroke, and bronze in the 200-meter breaststroke.  In his first event, the 100-meter breaststroke, Hansen finished second to Kosuke Kitajima with a time of 1:00.21. In his second event, the 200-meter breaststroke, Hansen finished in third place with a time 2:11.11. In the 4×100-meter medley relay, Hansen swam his leg with a time of 59.61 seconds and the American squad finished first with a world record time of 3:31.54.

2004 Olympics

Despite setting the world record in the 100-meter and 200-meter breaststroke at the 2004 U.S. Olympic trials, Hansen did not manage to win a gold medal in either event at the 2004 Summer Olympics, as he settled for silver in the 100, and a bronze in the 200. He would win a gold for his role in the world-record setting 4 × 100 medley relay. There was controversy in Kosuke Kitajima's win in the 100-meter breaststroke.  The U.S. team accused Kitajima of using an illegal dolphin kick however Olympic officials declined to issue any penalty. Grant Hackett said during London 2012 Australian television commentary that Hansen used a recording of Kitajima's roar of triumph after winning this race as his alarm clock for the next four years.

2005 World Championships

At the 2005 World Aquatics Championships in Montreal, Quebec, Hansen won gold in the 100-meter breaststroke, 200-meter breaststroke, and 4×100-meter medley relay.  In his first event, the 100-meter breaststroke, Hansen won with a time of 59.37 seconds, a championship record. In his second event, the 200-meter breaststroke, Hansen won with a time of 2:09.85. In the 4×100-meter medley relay, Hansen swam his leg with a time of 59.33 and the U.S. squad finished first with a time of 3:31.85.

2006

At the 2006 ConocoPhillips National Championships, Hansen lowered both his world records in the 100-meter and 200-meter breaststroke to 59.13 seconds in the 100-meter and 2:08.74 in the 200-meter.

At the 2006 Pan Pacific Swimming Championships held in Victoria, Canada, Hansen again lowered his world record time in the 200-meter breaststroke to 2:08.50.  It is notable that he was a quarter of a second behind his best time at the 150-meter mark, but he came back 0.60 of a second faster with a 33.38.

2007 World Championships

At the 2007 World Aquatics Championships in Melbourne, Australia, Hansen won gold in the 100-meter breaststroke and silver in the 50-meter breaststroke.  Hansen also was entered in the 200-meter breaststroke but did not start.  In the 100-meter breaststroke, Hansen won with a time of 59.80 seconds, 0.16 faster than second-place finisher Kosuke Kitajima. This victory made him the first and so far only four-time breaststroke world champion (long course).  In the 50-meter breaststroke, Hansen place second with a time of 27.69 seconds, just 0.03 slower than first-place finisher Oleh Lisohor.

2008 Olympics

Hansen swam the 100-meter breaststroke at the 2008 Summer Olympics, his only individual event, finishing in fourth place, but earned a gold medal as a member of the winning U.S. team in the 4×100-meter medley relay. He lost the medal while on a flight home from a party in his hometown near Philadelphia to Austin; it was returned to him the following day.

2011 Nationals

Hansen prepared for a comeback at the 2012 Summer Olympics, winning the 100-meter breaststroke and 200-meter breaststroke at the U.S. Nationals with times of 1:00.08 and 2:10.59 respectively.

2012 Olympics

At the 2012 United States Olympic Trials in Omaha, Nebraska, the qualifying meet for the U.S. Olympic Team, Hansen won the 100-meter breaststroke final, qualifying him to swim in that event and the 4×100-meter medley relay at the 2012 Summer Olympics.  He also competed in the 200-meter breaststroke and finished fourth.  At the 2012 Summer Olympics in London, Hansen finished third in 100-meter breaststroke for a bronze medal, and won a gold medal as a member of the winning U.S. team in the 4×100-meter medley relay. At the conclusion of the games, Hansen decided that the 2012 Olympics would be his final meet, retiring from the sport of swimming.

Personal best times
Hansen is a former world record holder in the 100- and 200-meter breaststroke (long course), as well as the 4×100-meter medley relay (long and short course). His personal best times are:

Long Course
  50 m Breast: 27.51 (March 27, 2007)
 100 m Breast: 59.13 (August 1, 2006)
 200 m Breast: 2:08.50 (August 21, 2006)

Short Course
  50 m Breast: 26.86 (October 11, 2004)
 100 m Breast: 57.47 (December 17, 2011)
 200 m Breast: 2:03.62 (December 16, 2011)

Post-retirement
Hansen continues to reside in Austin.

See also

 List of multiple Olympic gold medalists in one event
 List of Olympic medalists in swimming (men)
 List of United States records in swimming
 List of University of Texas at Austin alumni
 List of World Aquatics Championships medalists in swimming (men)
 World record progression 100 metres breaststroke
 World record progression 200 metres breaststroke
 World record progression 4 × 100 metres medley relay

References

External links
  (archive)
 
 
 
 
 

1981 births
Living people
American male breaststroke swimmers
World record setters in swimming
Medalists at the FINA World Swimming Championships (25 m)
Medalists at the 2012 Summer Olympics
Medalists at the 2008 Summer Olympics
Medalists at the 2004 Summer Olympics
Olympic gold medalists for the United States in swimming
Olympic bronze medalists for the United States in swimming
Olympic silver medalists for the United States in swimming
People from Haverford Township, Pennsylvania
Swimmers at the 2004 Summer Olympics
Swimmers at the 2008 Summer Olympics
Swimmers at the 2012 Summer Olympics
Swimming commentators
Texas Longhorns men's swimmers
World Aquatics Championships medalists in swimming
Sportspeople from Delaware County, Pennsylvania
Swimmers from Pennsylvania